José María Cañizares (born 18 February 1947) is a Spanish golfer.

Cañizares was born in Madrid. He turned professional in 1967 and made the top hundred on the European Tour Order of Merit every year from its first season in 1972 through to 1993. He placed in the top ten five times, with a best ranking of fourth in 1983. He won five events on the tour.

Cañizares was a member of four European Ryder Cup teams and had a record of 5 wins, 4 losses and two ties, including 2.5 points in four singles matches. In 1985 his singles victory over Fuzzy Zoeller rubber-stamped a European win that took the trophy from the Americans for the first time in 28 years. In 1989 his putt to beat Ken Green on the 18th at The Belfry ensured a 14–14 tie and keep the cup in European hands.

Cañizares won the World Cup team event for Spain on two occasions. In 1982, his partner was Manuel Piñero. In 1984, he teamed up with José Rivero, and on that occasion he also took the individual prize.

After becoming eligible for senior tournaments in 1997 Cañizares played mainly on the U.S.-based Champions Tour. He won once as a senior, at the 2001 Toshiba Senior Classic. In 2000 he had ten top ten finishes and set a then tour record for season earnings without a win of US$1,155,939. He also played a few times on the European Seniors Tour.

Cañizares' son Alejandro won a European Tour event in 2006 and a second one in 2014.

Professional wins (19)

European Tour wins (6)

European Tour playoff record (3–3)

Safari Circuit wins (1)

Other wins (11)
1970 Spanish Professional Closed Championship
1977 Memorial Olivier Barras, Spanish Professional Closed Championship
1978 Spanish Professional Closed Championship
1982 World Cup of Golf (team with Manuel Piñero), Spanish Professional Closed Championship
1984 World Cup of Golf (team with José Rivero), World Cup of Golf Individual Trophy
1988 Volvo Open (Spain)
1990 Benson & Hedges Trophy (with Tania Abitbol)
1991 Spanish Professional Closed Championship

Senior PGA Tour wins (1)

Senior PGA Tour playoff record (1–3)

Results in major championships

Note: Cañizares never played in the Masters Tournament nor the U.S. Open.

CUT = missed the half-way cut (3rd round cut in 1975 and 1981 Open Championships)
"T" = tied

Team appearances
World Cup (representing Spain): 1974, 1980, 1982 (winners), 1983, 1984 (winners, individual winner), 1985, 1987, 1989
Ryder Cup (representing Europe): 1981, 1983, 1985 (winners), 1989 (tied)
Double Diamond International (representing Continental Europe): 1974
Sotogrande Match/Hennessy Cognac Cup (representing the Continent of Europe): 1974, 1976, 1978, 1980, 1982, (representing Spain) 1984
Philip Morris International (representing Spain): 1975
Dunhill Cup (representing Spain): 1985, 1987, 1989, 1990
Praia d'El Rey European Cup: 1997 (winners)
UBS Warburg Cup (representing the Rest of the World): 2001

References

External links

Spanish male golfers
European Tour golfers
PGA Tour Champions golfers
European Senior Tour golfers
Ryder Cup competitors for Europe
Golfers from Madrid
1947 births
Living people
20th-century Spanish people
21st-century Spanish people